N-Methylephedrine is a derivative of ephedrine.  It has been isolated from Ephedra distachya.

In organic chemistry, N-methylephedrine is used as a resolving agent and as a precursor to chiral supporting electrolytes, phase-transfer catalysts, and reducing agents. Pharmacologically, N-methylephedrine is a non-selective adrenergic receptor agonist.

Just like ephedrine, it may have abuse potential . N-methylephedrine is one of the four constituents of BRON, a Japanese OTC cough medicine with reports of abuse. Addiction liability of BRON was attributed primarily to the Codeine component.

See also 
 N-Methylpseudoephedrine

References

Phenylethanolamines
Phenethylamine alkaloids
Dimethylamino compounds